The discography of The Donnas, an American all-female band, consists of 7 studio albums, 1 compilation and numerous singles and appearances on various other media.

Studio albums

Compilations
Greatest Hits Vol. 16 (2009)

Singles

{| class="wikitable plainrowheaders" style="text-align:center;"
|-
! rowspan="2"| Year
! rowspan="2" style="width:16em;"| Single
! colspan="5"| Peak chartpositions
! rowspan="2"| Album
|- style="font-size:smaller;"
! scope="col" style="width:3em;font-size:90%;"| USAlt.
! width="40"| USMain.Rock
! width="45"| AUS
! width="40"| UK
! width="40"| NL
|-
| 1995
! scope="row"| "High School Yum Yum"
| —
| —
| —
| —
| —
| rowspan="3"| The Donnas
|-
| rowspan="2"| 1996
! scope="row"| "Let's Go Mano"
| —
| —
| —
| —
| —
|-
! scope="row"| "Da Doo Ron Ron"
| —
| —
| —
| —
| —
|-
| rowspan="2"| 1998
! scope="row"| "Wig-Wam Bam"
| —
| —
| —
| —
| —
| 
|-
! scope="row"| "Rock 'n' Roll Machine"
| —
| — 
| —
| —
| —
| American Teenage Rock 'n' Roll Machine
|-
| rowspan="2"| 1999
! scope="row"| "Strutter"
| —
| —
| —
| —
| —
|  
|-
! scope="row"| "Get You Alone"
| —
| —
| —
| —
| —
| Get Skintight
|-
| rowspan="2"| 2002
! scope="row"| "40 Boys in 40 Nights"
| —
| —
| —
| —
| —
| The Donnas Turn 21
|-
! scope="row"| "Take It Off"
| 17
| 31
| —
| 38
| 100
| rowspan="3"|  Spend the Night
|-
| rowspan="2"| 2003
! scope="row"| "Who Invited You"
| —
| —
| 84
| 61
| —
|-
! scope="row"| "Too Bad About Your Girl"
| —
| —
| —
| —
| —
|-
| 2004
! scope="row"| "Fall Behind Me"
| 29
| —
| 93
| 55
| —
| rowspan="2"|  Gold Medal
|-
| 2005
! scope="row"| "I Don't Want to Know (If You Don't Want Me)"
| —
| —
| —
| 55
| —
|-
| 2007
! scope="row"| "Don't Wait Up for Me"
| —
| —
| —
| —
| —
| Bitchin'''
|-
| 2009
! scope="row"| "Get Off"
| —
| —
| —
| —
| —
| Greatest Hits Vol. 16|-
| colspan="10"|"—" denotes that a recording did not chart.
|}

Songs on soundtracks and compilations
"Speeding Back to My Baby" – Gearhead Compilation (1998)
"Strutter" – Detroit Rock City soundtrack (1999)
"Keep on Loving You" – Drive Me Crazy soundtrack (1999)
"Rock n' Roll Machine" – Jawbreaker soundtrack (1999)
"Checkin' It Out" – Jawbreaker soundtrack (1999)
"Wig-Wam Bam" – Runnin' on Fumes! / The Gearhead Magazine Singles Compilation (2000)
"Backstage" – Freaky Friday soundtrack (2003)
"Too Bad About Your Girl" - Grind soundtrack (2003)
"Take It Off" - Dodgeball soundtrack (2004)
"Take Me to the Backseat" - D.E.B.S soundtrack (2004)
"Dancing With Myself" – Mean Girls OST (2004) & I Love You, Man (2009)
"Please Don't Tease" – New York Minute soundtrack (2004)
"Everyone Is Wrong" – Elektra soundtrack (2005)
"Roll on Down the Highway" – Herbie: Fully Loaded soundtrack (2005)
"Drive My Car" – This Bird Has Flown - A 40th Anniversary Tribute to the Beatles' Rubber Soul (2005)
"I Don't Want To Know (If You Don't Want Me)" – The N Soundtrack (2006)
"California Sun" -(Brett Anderson solo), "Brats On The Beat:Ramones For Kids" (2006)
"Kids In America" – Nancy Drew soundtrack (2007)
"Christmas Wrapping" - Shrek The Halls soundtrack (2007)
"Round and Round" - (w/Stephen Pearcy of RATT), Stephen Pearcy's "Under My Skin" (2008)
"Take It Off" - The Hangover soundtrack (2009)
"Queens of Noise" - Take It or Leave It - A Tribute to the Queens of Noise: The Runaways (2011)

As Ragady AnneRagady Anne [7" EP] (1995) (Radio Trash Records)

As The ElectrocutesSteal Yer Lunch Money (released 1998) (Sympathy for the Record Industry)

Film and television appearancesJawbreaker (film) (TriStar Pictures, 1999)Drive Me Crazy 1999Saturday Night Live (NBC, 2003) (Hosted by Ray Liotta)
Bud Light commercial (2003)I Love the 90's (VH1, 2004)
Charmed (2004)
MADtv (2005)I Love the '70s: Volume 2 (VH1, 2006)I Love the New Millennium'' (VH1, 2008)
Beautiful Noise (2008)
WCG Ultimate Gamer (2009)
VH1's Undatable (2010)

Music videos
1998: "Get Rid Of That Girl"
1999: "Skintight" & "Strutter"
2001: "40 Boys in 40 Nights" & "Do You Wanna Hit It?" (animated)
2002: "Take It Off" & "Who Invited You"
2003: "Too Bad About Your Girl"
2004: "Fall Behind Me"
2005: "I Don't Want To Know (If You Don't Want Me)"
2007: "Don't Wait Up For Me"
2009: "Get Off" (career spanning footage)

References

Rock music group discographies
Discographies of American artists
Alternative rock discographies